Penhill is a prominent hill in the Pennines, North Yorkshire, England

Penhill may also refer to:

 Penhill, a neighbourhood and administrative area of Swindon, Wiltshire, England
 Penhill, London, a neighbourhood in Bexley, London, forming part of the Blendon and Penhill ward
 Penhill (horse),  a British-bred racehorse best known for his achievements in National Hunt racing
 Penhill F.C., former association football club from Penhill, Swindon, Wiltshire, England
 Penhill Giant, a giant found in English folklore and legends
 Penhill Preceptory, a former priory on the northern flanks of Penhill in Wensleydale, North Yorkshire, England
 Pen Hill, a hill in the Mendip Hills in Somerset, England